T. lutea may refer to:

 Taperina lutea, a daddy longlegs
 Thalesia lutea, a broomrape native to North America
 Thunbergia lutea, an Old World plant
 Tigridia lutea, a South American plant
 Trapezia lutea, a guard crab
 Trapezites lutea, an Australian butterfly
 Trimezia lutea, a New World plant
 Tulipa lutea, a perennial plant